Masaba Masaba is an Indian biographical drama streaming television series based on the life of Masaba Gupta. It is written and directed by Sonam Nair and is produced by Ashvini Yardi's Viniyard Films. It stars Masaba Gupta and her mother, Neena Gupta, playing themselves. The series premiered on Netflix on 28 August 2020. The second season premiered on 29 July 2022.

Premise
The series is a scripted version of the life of Masaba Gupta, featuring her family, her love life and her career as a fashion designer. Masaba and her mother, Neena Gupta, play fictionalized versions of themselves.

Cast

Season 1

Main 
 Masaba Gupta as herself
 Neena Gupta as herself
 Neil Bhoopalam as Dhairya Rana
 Rytasha Rathore as Gia
 Satyadeep Mishra as Vinay
 Pooja Bedi as Geeta Chopra
 Suchitra Pillai as Mohini
 Tanuj Virwani as Manav
 Smaran Sahu as Jogi
 Nayan Shukla as Gehna
 Gobind Singh Mehta as Cyrus
 Sunita Rajwar as Padma

Cameo appearances 
 Kiara Advani as herself
 Shibani Dandekar as herself
 Farah Khan as herself
 Mithila Palkar as herself
 Malavika Mohanan as herself
 Gajraj Rao as himself
 Dara Sandhu as himself
 Abhishek Bhalerao as driving instructor

Season 2

Main 
Masaba Gupta as herself
 Neena Gupta as herself
 Neil Bhoopalam as Dhairya Rana
 Rytasha Rathore as Gia
 Kusha Kapila as Nicole
 Barkha Singh as Aisha Mehrauli
 Armaan Khera as Fateh
 Kareema Barry as Qayanaat 
 Ram Kapoor as Shekhar Mirza
 Nayan Shukla as Gehna
 Yamini Joshi as Girl for event

Cameo appearances 

 Kartik Aaryan as Dr. K
 Neelam Kothari as herself
 Milind Soman as himself
 Bappi Lahiri as himself
 Maria Goretti as Aisha's mother
 Kanwaljit Singh as himself

Episodes

Season 1 (2020)

Season 2 (2022)

Production
The series was announced by Netflix on 16 July 2019, with Sonam Nair as the director. It is Masaba's debut role. The first trailer was released on 14 August 2020.

Season 2 
In June 2022, Netflix announced that the series was renewed for a second season. It premiered on 29 July 2022.

References

External links
 
 Masaba Masaba on Netflix

English-language Netflix original programming
2020 Indian television series debuts
Indian television series distributed by Netflix